Ehrharteae is a tribe in the grass family, comprising four genera.

References

Poaceae tribes
Oryzoideae